The Lilydale Football Club is an Australian rules football club located in the outer eastern Melbourne suburb of Lilydale. Known as the "Falcons", the club fields both senior and junior teams in the Eastern Football League.

History
The Lilydale Football Club is one of the oldest Australian Rules clubs, having been formed in 1872 and incorporated in 1984. They have won premierships in 1891, 1913, 1919, 1922, 1923, 1924, 1936, 1940, 1946, 1988, 1991, 1996 and 1998 and 2003. In 2006, The Falcons made it to the division one finals for the time in its history. They also backed that up the following year. However, in both years they were knocked out in the first game against East Ringwood and EFL newcomers, Balwyn. Former Coach Brett Fisher was rewarded both years by being named SEN division one coach of the year. After the 2009 and 2010 seasons the club lost many of its star players and in 2010 was relegated to the second division. They won the flag in second division and managed to stay in first division until relegated after finishing last in season 2014. The club magazine is the Flanker. The Coterie Group are known as the Falconians.

Former Notable Players 
 Fraser Brown – Carlton 177 games, 1995 Premiership
 Adrian Cox – Hawthorn 54 games
 Ashley Matthews – Carlton 9 games  – Fitzroy 6 games
 Kieren Harper - North Melbourne Football Club 40 games

External links
 Club website

Eastern Football League (Australia) clubs
1872 establishments in Australia
Australian rules football clubs established in 1872
Sport in the Shire of Yarra Ranges